Sadhu (IAST:  (male), sādhvī or sādhvīne (female)), also spelled saddhu, is a religious ascetic, mendicant or any holy person in Hinduism,  Buddhism, and Jainism who has renounced the worldly life. They are sometimes alternatively referred to as  yogi, sannyasi or vairagi.

Sādhu means one who practises a 'sadhana' or keenly follows a path of spiritual discipline. Although the vast majority of sādhus are yogīs, not all yogīs are sādhus. A sādhu's life is solely dedicated to achieving mokṣa (liberation from the cycle of death and rebirth), the fourth and final aśrama (stage of life), through meditation and contemplation of Brahman. Sādhus often wear simple clothing, such as saffron-coloured clothing in Hinduism and white or nothing in Jainism, symbolising their sannyāsa (renunciation of worldly possessions). A female mendicant in Hinduism and Jainism is often called a sadhvi, or in some texts as aryika.

Etymology

The term sadhu (Sanskrit: साधु) appears in Rigveda and Atharvaveda where it means "straight, right, leading straight to goal", according to Monier Monier-Williams. In the Brahmanas layer of Vedic literature, the term connotes someone who is "well disposed, kind, willing, effective or efficient, peaceful, secure, good, virtuous, honourable, righteous, noble" depending on the context. In the Hindu Epics, the term implies someone who is a "saint, sage, seer, holy man, virtuous, chaste, honest or right".

The Sanskrit terms sādhu ("good man") and sādhvī ("good woman") refer to renouncers who have chosen to live lives apart from or on the edges of society to focus on their own spiritual practices.

The words come from the root sādh, which means "reach one's goal", "make straight", or "gain power over". The same root is used in the word sādhanā, which means "spiritual practice". It literally means one who practises a ″sadhana″ or a path of spiritual discipline.

Demographics and lifestyle
Unlike skilled workers and professionals, there is no certification for sadhus. So, it is very difficult to determine the exact number of sadhus. According to various assumptions, there are 4 to 5 million sadhus in India today. Sadhus are widely respected for their holiness. It is also thought that the austere practices of the sadhus help to burn off their karma and that of the community at large. Thus seen as benefiting society, sadhus are supported by donations from many people. However, reverence of sadhus is by no means universal in India. For example, Nath yogi sadhus have been viewed with a certain degree of suspicion particularly amongst the urban populations of India, but they have been revered and are popular in rural India.

There are naked (digambara, or "sky-clad") sadhus who wear their hair in thick dreadlocks called jata. Sadhus engage in a wide variety of religious practices. Some practice asceticism and solitary meditation, while others prefer group praying, chanting or meditating. They typically live a simple lifestyle, and have very few or no possessions. Many sadhus have rules for alms collection, and do not visit the same place twice on different days to avoid bothering the residents. They generally walk or travel over distant places, homeless, visiting temples and pilgrimage centers as a part of their spiritual practice. Celibacy is common, but some sects experiment with consensual tantric sex as a part of their practice. Sex is viewed by them as a transcendence from a personal, intimate act to something impersonal and ascetic.

Sadhu sects

Hinduism

Shaiva sadhus are renunciants devoted to Shiva, and Vaishnava sadhus are renouncers devoted to Vishnu (or his avatar like Rama or Krishna). The Vaishnava sadhus are sometimes referred to as vairagis. Less numerous are Shakta sadhus, who are devoted to Shakti. Within these general divisions are numerous sects and sub-sects, reflecting different lineages and philosophical schools and traditions often referred to as "sampradayas". Each sampradaya has several "orders" called parampara based on the lineage of the founder of the order. Each sampradaya and parampara may have several monastic and martial akharas.

Within the Shaiva sadhus are many subgroups. Most Shaiva sadhus wear a Tripundra mark on their forehead, dress in saffron, red or orange color clothes, and live a monastic life. Some sadhus such as the Aghori share the practices of ancient Kapalikas, where they beg with a skull, smeared their body with ashes from the cremation ground, and experiment with substances or practices that are generally abhorred by society.

Among the Shaiva sadhus, the Dashanami Sampradaya belong to the Smarta Tradition. They are said to have been formed by the philosopher and renunciant Adi Shankara, believed to have lived in the 8th century CE, though the full history of the sect's formation is not clear. Among them are the Naga subgroups, naked sadhu known for carrying weapons like tridents, swords, canes, and spears. Said to have once functioned as an armed order to protect Hindus from the Mughal rulers, they were involved in a number of military defence campaigns. Generally in the ambit of non-violence at present, some sections are known to practice wrestling and martial arts. Their retreats are still called chhaavni or armed camps (akhara), and mock duels are still sometimes held between them.

Female sadhus (sadhvis) exist in many sects. In many cases, the women that take to the life of renunciation are widows, and these types of sadhvis often live secluded lives in ascetic compounds. Sadhvis are sometimes regarded by some as manifestations or forms of the Goddess, or Devi, and are honoured as such. There have been a number of charismatic sadhvis that have risen to fame as religious teachers in contemporary India, e.g. Anandamayi Ma, Sarada Devi, Mata Amritanandamayi, and Karunamayi.

Jainism
The Jain community is traditionally discussed in its texts with four terms: sadhu (monks), sadhvi or aryika (nuns), sravaka (laymen householders) and sravika (laywomen householders). As in Hinduism and Buddhism, the Jain householders support the monastic community. The sadhus and sadhvis are intertwined with the Jain lay society, perform murtipuja (Jina idol worship) and lead festive rituals, and they are organized in a strongly hierarchical monastic structure.

There are differences between the Digambara and Svetambara sadhus and sadhvi traditions. The Digambara sadhus own no clothes as a part of their interpretation of Five vows, and they live their ascetic austere lives in nakedness. The Digambara sadhvis wear white clothes. The Svetambara sadhus and sadhvis both wear white clothes. According to a 2009 publication by Harvey J. Sindima, Jain monastic community had 6,000 sadhvis of which less than 100 belong to the Digambara tradition and rest to Svetambara.

Becoming a sadhu

The processes and rituals of becoming a sadhu vary with sect; in almost all sects, a sadhu is initiated by a guru, who bestows upon the initiate a new name, as well as a mantra, (or sacred sound or phrase), which is generally known only to the sadhu and the guru and may be repeated by the initiate as part of meditative practice.

Becoming a sadhu is a path followed by millions. It is supposed to be the fourth phase in a Hindu's life, after studies, being a father and a pilgrim, but for most it is not a practical option. For a person to become sadhu needs vairagya. Vairagya means desire to achieve something by leaving the world (cutting familial, societal and earthly attachments).

A person who wants to become sadhu must first seek a guru. There, he or she must perform guruseva which means service. The guru decides whether the person is eligible to take sannyasa by observing the sisya (the person who wants to become a sadhu or sanyasi). If the person is eligible, guru upadesa (which means teachings) is done. Only then, the person transforms into sanyasi or sadhu. There are different types of sanyasis in India who follow different sampradya. But, all sadhus have a common goal: attaining moksha (liberation).

Festive gatherings

Kumbh Mela, a mass-gathering of sadhus from all parts of India, takes place every three years at one of four points along sacred rivers in India, including the holy river Ganges. In 2007 it was held in Nasik, Maharashtra. Peter Owen-Jones filmed one episode of "Extreme Pilgrim" there during this event. It took place again in Haridwar in 2010. Sadhus of all sects join in this reunion. Millions of non-sadhu pilgrims also attend the festivals, and the Kumbh Mela is the largest gathering of human beings for a single religious purpose on the planet. The Kumbh Mela of 2013 started on 14 January of that year at Allahabad. At the festival, sadhus appear in large numbers, including those "completely naked with ash-smeared bodies, [who] sprint into the chilly waters for a dip at the crack of dawn".

Gallery

See also

 Types
 Aghori
 Godman
 Nath
 Shramana
 Lineage
 Guru–shishya tradition
 Parampara
 Sampradaya
 Lifestyle
 Akhara
 Chillum 
 Kaupinam
 Kacchera
 Langota

Notes

References

Further reading

 
 Indian Sadhus, by Govind Sadashiv Ghurye, L. N. Chapekar. Published by Popular Prakashan, 1964.
 Sadhus of India: The Sociological View, by Bansi Dhar Tripathi. Published by Popular Prakashan, 1978.
 The Sadhu: A Study in Mysticism and Practical Religion, by Burnett Hillman Streeter, Aiyadurai Jesudasen Appasamy. Published by Mittal, 1987. .
 The Way of the Vaishnava Sages: A Medieval Story of South Indian Sadhus : Based on the Sanskrit Notes of Vishnu-Vijay Swami, by N. S. Narasimha, Rāmānanda, Vishnu-Vijay. Published by University Press of America, 1987. .
 Sadhus: The Holy Men of India, by Rajesh Bedi. Published by Entourage Pub, 1993. .
 Sadhus: Holy Men of India, by Dolf Hartsuiker. Published by Thames & Hudson, 1993. .
 The Sadhus and Indian Civilisation, by Vijay Prakash Sharma. Published by Anmol Publications PVT. LTD., 1998. .
 Women in Ochre Robes: Gendering Hindu Renunciation, by Meena Khandelwal. Published by State University of New York Press, 2003. .
 Wandering with Sadhus: Ascetics in the Hindu Himalayas, Sondra L. Hausner, Bloomington, Indiana University Press, 2007. 
 Naked in Ashes, Paradise Filmworks International – Documentary on Naga Sadhus of Northern India.

External links

 Sadhus and Yogis of India
 "Sadhus from India"—Extract from The Last Free Men by José Manuel Novoa
 "Interview of a Sadhu Living Inside a Cave in the Himalayas"—Episode from Ganga Ma: A Pilgrimage to the Source by Pepe Ozan and Melitta Tchaicovsky

Beggars
Moksha
Hindu prayer and meditation
Jain practices
Titles and occupations in Hinduism